Bobaye is a mountain in Sudurpashchim Province, Nepal.

It was first climbed on 2 November 1996 by Tomaz Humar.

References

External links 

 Bobaye at Nepal Himal Peak Profile

Seven-thousanders of the Himalayas
Mountains of the Sudurpashchim Province